Mother city may refer to:
 Cape Town, the second-most populated city in South Africa
 Metropolis, a large urban area
  Mother City F.C., a football club based in Cape Town

See also 
 Mother of Cities (disambiguation)
 Queen City (disambiguation)